Dostpur is a town and a nagar panchayat in Sultanpur district  in the state of Uttar Pradesh, India. The town borders Sultanpur and Ambedkarnagar. Purvanchal Expressway passes near the town.

Geography
Dostpur town area have very critical position and daily traffic jam in road

Demographics
As of 2011 Indian Census, Dostpur had a total population of 14,011, of which 7,217 were males and 6,794 were females. Population within the age group of 0 to 6 years was 2,232. The total number of literates in Bahraich was 9,155, which constituted 65.3% of the population with male literacy of 70.4% and female literacy of 60.0%. The effective literacy rate of 7+ population of Dostpur was 77.7%, of which male literacy rate was 84.1% and female literacy rate was 71.0%. The Scheduled Castes population was 3,149. Dostpur had 1984 households in 2011.

 India census, Dostpur had a population of 11,877. Males constitute 53% of the population and females 47%. Dostpur has an average literacy rate of 57%, lower than the national average of 59.5%: male literacy is 63% and, female literacy is 51%. In Dostpur, 18% of the population in the age range of 0-6 years.

Dostpur is situated at the border of Sultanpur district. The river named "Majhui" separates Sultanpur district from Ambedkar Nagar.

References

Cities and towns in Sultanpur district